Lacebark is a common name for several plants, lacebark trees and may refer to:

 lacebark or lace-bark, a textile made from Lagetta lagetto species
 lacebark, a common name for species in the genus Brachychiton
 lacebark, a common name for species in the genus Hoheria
 lacebark elm, a common name for Ulmus parvifolia
 lacebark pine, a common name for Pinus bungeana